The 1981 Marshall Thundering Herd football team was an American football team that represented Marshall University in the Southern Conference (SoCon) during the 1981 NCAA Division I-A football season. In its third season under head coach Sonny Randle, the team compiled a 2–9 record (1–5 against conference opponents) and was outscored by a total of 284 to 94. The team played its home games at Fairfield Stadium in Huntington, West Virginia.

Schedule

Roster

References

Marshall
Marshall Thundering Herd football seasons
Marshall Thundering Herd football